Kim In-Kyung, also called In-Kyung Kim and I. K. Kim (born 13 June 1988), is a South Korean professional golfer currently playing on the LPGA Tour.

Amateur career
Kim was a member of the Korean National Team in 2003 and 2004 and won three tournaments on the International Junior Golf tour. In 2005, playing on the American Junior Golf Association (AJGA), she won the 2005 Hargray Junior Classic. Also in 2005, she won the U.S. Girls' Junior and was the medalist in the stroke play portion of the U.S. Women's Amateur.

Professional career
Kim earned co-medalist honors at the LPGA Final Qualifying Tournament in Florida in December 2006 as an amateur to earn full exempt status for the 2007 season. She turned professional immediately following the tournament.

In her rookie year of 2007 she had four top-10 finishes on the LPGA Tour. In 2008, she had seven top-10 finishes and claimed her first win at the Longs Drugs Challenge.

In June 2009, she claimed her second career title with a one-shot win over compatriot Se Ri Pak to take the LPGA State Farm Classic in Illinois. In December 2009 Kim won her third professional title, winning the Dubai Ladies Masters on the Ladies European Tour.

Kim won her fourth professional title and third LPGA title at the 2010 Lorena Ochoa Invitational. The day after she won, she announced that she had donated her entire $220,000 winnings to charity:  half to the Lorena Ochoa Foundation which funds educational programs for children in Mexico and the other half to an American charity. The donation amounted to nearly 20 percent of her total winnings to date for the 2010 season.

In 2010 Kim also won Rookie of the Year honors on the Ladies European Tour. She joined the LET in 2010 after winning the Dubai Ladies Masters in December 2009. In 2010, she had won €193,154.69 in four LET events, including three top-10 finishes.

Currently, former PGA Tour caddy Michael Dunsmore carries Kim's bag.  In early 2010, Kim bought a home in Rancho Santa Fe, California, a suburb north of San Diego. She practices at Fairbanks Ranch Country Club, where she is an honorary member.

On the final day of the 2012 Kraft Nabisco Championship, Kim had a one-foot putt on the 18th green to seal her first major championship. The putt lipped out, forcing a playoff with Sun-Young Yoo, which Yoo won. This disappointment was followed by a relative dry spell for Kim on LPGA Tour which included two playoff losses, and one win on the European Ladies Tour in 2014. The LPGA dry spell ended in October 2016 when Kim won Reignwood LPGA Classic held in China. In 2017 Kim won three times on the LPGA Tour, including her first major title at the Women's British Open.

Professional wins (10)

LPGA Tour wins (7)

LPGA Tour playoff record (0–5)

Ladies European Tour wins (4)

Major championships

Wins (1)

Results timeline
Results not in chronological order before 2020.

^ The Evian Championship was added as a major in 2013.

CUT = missed the half-way cut
NT = no tournament
T = tied

Summary

Most consecutive cuts made – 16 (2008 U.S. Open – 2012 LPGA)
Longest streak of top-10s – 4 (2010 LPGA – 2011 Kraft Nabisco)

LPGA Tour career summary

 Official as of 2022 season

Team appearances
Professional
Lexus Cup (representing Asia team): 2007 (winners)
International Crown (representing South Korea): 2014, 2018 (winners)

References

External links

Profile on Seoul Sisters.com website

South Korean female golfers
LPGA Tour golfers
Ladies European Tour golfers
Winners of LPGA major golf championships
1988 births
Living people